Two Mills is a 1650s painting by the Dutch painter Jacob van Ruisdael. It is now in the Musée des Beaux-Arts of Strasbourg, France. Its inventory number is 625.

The painting belongs to a series of depictions of a watermill either at  near Denekamp, or at Haaksbergen near Enschede. It was bought at Colnaghi's for the Strasbourg museum by Wilhelm von Bode around 1892; the painting had previously belonged to the collector Albert Levy of London and Colnaghi had bought it at the sale of Levy's collection on 16 June 1876, item number 360, for 126 British pounds.

References

Paintings in the collection of the Musée des Beaux-Arts de Strasbourg
1650s paintings
Paintings by Jacob van Ruisdael
Water in art
Oil paintings